The hard X-ray nanoprobe at the Center for Nanoscale Materials (CNM), Argonne National Lab advanced the state of the art by providing a hard X-ray microscopy beamline with the highest spatial resolution in the world. It provides for fluorescence, diffraction, and transmission imaging with hard X-rays at a spatial resolution of 30 nm or better. A dedicated source, beamline, and optics form the basis for these capabilities. This unique instrument is not only key to the specific research areas of the CNM; it will also be a general utility, available to the broader nanoscience community in studying nanomaterials and nanostructures, particularly for embedded structures.

The combination of diffraction, fluorescence, and transmission contrast in a single tool provides unique characterization capabilities for nanoscience. Current hard X-ray microprobes based on Fresnel zone plate optics have demonstrated a spatial resolution of 150 nm at a photon energy of 8-10 keV. With advances in the fabrication of zone plate optics, coupled with an optimized beamline design, the performance goal is a spatial resolution of 30 nm. The nanoprobe covers the spectral range of 3-30 keV, and the working distance between the focusing optics and the sample are typically in the range of 10–20 mm.

Modes of operation
Transmission. In this mode, either attenuation or phase shift of the X-ray beam by the sample can be measured. Absorption contrast can be used to map the sample’s density. Particular elemental constituents can be located using measurements on each side of an absorption edge to give an element-specific difference image with moderate sensitivity. Phase-contrast imaging can be sensitive to internal structure even when absorption is low and can be enhanced by tuning the X-ray energy.

Diffraction. By measuring X-rays diffracted from the sample, one can obtain local structural information, such as crystallographic phase, strain, and texture, with an accuracy 100 times higher than with standard electron diffraction.

Fluorescence. Induced X-ray fluorescence reveals the spatial distribution of individual elements in a sample. Because an X-ray probe offers 1,000 times higher sensitivity than electron probes, the fluorescence technique is a powerful tool for quantitative trace element analysis, important for understanding material properties such as second-phase particles, defects, and interfacial segregation.

Spectroscopy. In spectroscopy mode, the primary X-ray beam’s energy is scanned across the absorption edge of an element, providing information on its chemical state (XANES) or its local environment (EXAFS), which allows the study of disordered samples.

Polarization. Both linearly and circularly polarized X-rays will be available. Contrast due to polarization is invaluable in distinguishing fluorescence and diffraction signals and imaging magnetic domain structure by using techniques such as linear and circular dichroism and magnetic diffraction.

Tomography. In X-ray tomography, one of these modes is combined with sample rotation to produce a series of two-dimensional projection images, to be used for reconstructing the sample’s internal three-dimensional structure. This will be particularly important for observing the morphology of complex nanostructures.

In summary, a hard X-ray nanoprobe provides advantages such as being noninvasive and quantitative, requiring minimal sample preparation, giving sub-optical spatial resolution, having the ability to penetrate inside a sample and study its internal structure, and having enhanced ability to study processes in situ. Another important distinction from charged-particle probes is that X-rays do not interact with applied electric or magnetic fields, which is an advantage for in-field studies. The design of the nanoprobe beamline aims to preserve these potential advantages.

Activities
 Hard X-ray nanoprobe
 Large numerical aperture optics for hard X-rays
 Time-resolved, stroboscopic measurements
 Full-field imaging
 In situ studies of nanomaterials growth processes
 Scanning probe fluorescence, diffraction, and transmission phase contrast imaging
 Polarization dependent scattering
 General nanomaterials characterization with X-rays, including small-angle scattering (SAXS)

Nanoprobe